Dissimulate is the second album, released in 2002, by the death metal band The Berzerker. This is the only full-length album the band has released that features an actual drummer instead of a drum machine.

The album is characterized by some quotes from the Italian film "Africa Addio".

Reception 

Allmusic    [ link]
Terrorizer  (Nov 2008)

Track listing 
"Disregard" – 1:20
"Failure" – 2:26
"The Principles and Practices of Embalming" – 3:25
"No One Wins" – 1:50
"Death Reveals" – 1:56
"Compromise" – 2:43
"Betrayal" – 2:30
"Last Mistake" – 3:20
"Painless" – 3:16
"Pure Hatred" – 1:24
"Paradox" – 2:06
"Abandonment" – 1:36
"Corporal Jigsore Quandary" (Carcass cover) – 5:34

Personnel 
 Luke Kenny – vocals, samples, drum programming
 Matt Wilcock – guitar
 Sam Bean – bass, vocals
 Gary Thomas – drums

2002 albums
The Berzerker albums
Earache Records albums